The Hunter Island, the main island of the Hunter Island Group, is a  island, located in Bass Strait, that lies between King Island and north-west Tasmania, Australia.

The island is located near Three Hummock Island, several kilometres off the north-west coast of Tasmania. The island is run as a cattle property and there is a homestead on the island. A privately owned barge is used for transport to Smithton on the north coast of Tasmania.

The East India Ship Phatisalam was wrecked on the island in 1821.

Hunter Island Group
The Hunter Island Group includes:

 Hunter Island
 Albatross Island
 Bears Island
 Bird Island
 Black Pyramid Rock
 Dugay Islet
 Edwards Islet
 Nares Rocks
 Penguin Islet
 South Black Rock
 Steep Island
 Stack Island
 Three Hummock Island

Birds

The island forms part of the Hunter Island Group Important Bird Area because it lies on the migration route of the critically endangered orange-bellied parrot between south-west Tasmania and mainland south-eastern Australia.

See also

 List of islands of Tasmania

References

Important Bird Areas of Tasmania
Islands of Australia (tenure: conservation area)
Localities of Circular Head Council
Islands of Bass Strait
Surfing locations in Tasmania